Kvamskogen (lit. Kvam forest) is a mountain plateau in the Hardanger region of Vestland county, Norway. It is located in the municipalities of Samnanger and Kvam. Traditionally, the term was used only for the parts of the plateau located in Kvam municipality, but today it is used for the entire plateau. Kvamskogen contains several ski resorts, and more than 1700 cabins, the third highest concentration of cabins in the country.

References

External links 

Kvamskogen

Landforms of Vestland
Plateaus of Norway
Samnanger
Kvam